The Athens Blade was a short-lived African-American weekly newspaper published in Athens, Georgia. Its early publishers were W.A. Pledger and W.H. Heard.

See also
List of African-American newspapers in Georgia

References

External links 

Defunct newspapers published in Georgia (U.S. state)
Companies based in Athens, Georgia
Newspapers established in 1879
Publications disestablished in 1880
Defunct African-American newspapers
Defunct weekly newspapers
1879 establishments in Georgia (U.S. state)
1880 disestablishments in Georgia (U.S. state)
African-American history of Georgia (U.S. state)